Jared Cannonier (born March 16, 1984) is an American professional mixed martial artist. He currently fights in the Middleweight division for the Ultimate Fighting Championship (UFC). As of November 15, 2022, he is #3 in the UFC middleweight rankings.

Mixed martial arts career

Early career
Cannonier began his amateur mixed martial arts career in early 2011, winning his first two fights by knockout.  In June 2011, he made his professional MMA debut in Alaska. He fought sporadically over the next five years, amassing a record of 7–0.

Ultimate Fighting Championship

2015
In October 2014, it was announced that Cannonier had signed with the UFC. In his debut he faced Shawn Jordan in a Heavyweight bout at UFC 182 on January 3, 2015. He lost the fight via knockout in the first round.

Replacing injured Matt Van Buren, Cannonier was scheduled to face Jonathan Wilson at UFC Fight Night 73 on August 8, 2015. In turn, Cannonier was forced to pull out due to an injury and was replaced by Chris Dempsey.

2016
After an 18-month long layoff, Cannonier returned to face Cyril Asker on April 10, 2016, at UFC Fight Night: Rothwell vs. dos Santos. He defeated Asker by knockout due to a combination of elbows and punches. The win also earned Cannonier his first Performance of the Night bonus award.

In his third fight for the promotion, Cannonier moved down a weight class to the light heavyweight division. He faced Ion Cuțelaba on December 3, 2016, at The Ultimate Fighter 24 Finale. Cannonier won the fight by unanimous decision. The bout also won Cannonier his second consecutive bonus award as he and Cuțelaba won Fight of the Night.

2017
As the first fight of his new six-fight contract, Cannonier faced Glover Teixeira on February 11, 2017, at UFC 208. He lost the fight by unanimous decision.

Cannonier was expected to face Steve Bossé on July 7, 2017, at The Ultimate Fighter 25 Finale. However, Bossé was removed from the fight just days before the event and was replaced by promotional newcomer Nick Roehrick. Cannonier won the fight via TKO in the third round.

Cannonier was expected to face Antônio Rogério Nogueira on December 16, 2017, at UFC on Fox 26. However, on October 19, it was announced that Nogueira was pulled from the card after being notified by USADA of a potential doping violation. Cannonier would face Jan Błachowicz instead. He lost the fight via unanimous decision.

2018
Cannonier faced Dominick Reyes on May 19, 2018, at UFC Fight Night 129. He lost the fight via TKO in the first round.

Cannonier was expected to face Alessio Di Chirico in a middleweight bout on November 17, 2018, at UFC Fight Night 140. However, it was reported on October 19, 2018, that Cannonier would face David Branch at UFC 230 instead. He won the fight via technical knockout in round two. This win earned him the Performance of the Night award.

2019
Cannonier faced former UFC Middleweight champion Anderson Silva on May 11, 2019, at UFC 237. He won the fight via TKO in the first round after a kick to Silva's right leg rendered him unable to continue.

Cannonier faced Jack Hermansson on September 28, 2019, in the main event of UFC on ESPN+ 18. He was victorious via second-round TKO. The win also earned Cannonier his third Performance of the Night bonus award.

2020
Cannonier was scheduled to face former UFC Middleweight Champion Robert Whittaker on March 7, 2020, at UFC 248. However, on January 15, 2020, it was announced Whittaker pulled out of the bout for undisclosed reasons.

Cannonier was slated to serve as a backup fighter for the UFC Middleweight Championship fight between Israel Adesanya and Yoel Romero at UFC 248 on March 7, 2020, however, on February 14, 2020, Cannonier announced he had suffered a torn pectoral muscle and expects to be out of action for six months.

Cannonier faced Robert Whittaker on October 24, 2020 at UFC 254. Cannonier lost the fight via unanimous decision. After the fight, Cannonier revealed in an Instagram post that he suffered a broken arm from a kick that Whittaker landed in the first round.

2021 
Cannonier was scheduled to face Paulo Costa on August 21, 2021, at UFC on ESPN 29. However, on June 4, Costa withdrew from the bout, claiming he never signed the bout agreement and had issues with his payment, while not confirming them as the reason for his withdrawal. It was later confirmed that Kelvin Gastelum replaced Costa. Cannonier won the fight via unanimous decision.

2022
As the first bout of his new six-fight contract, Cannonier was scheduled to face Derek Brunson on January 22, 2022, at UFC 270. However, for undisclosed reasons the bout was moved to UFC 271 on February 12, 2022. He won the fight via knockout in round two. The win earned him a Performance of the Night bonus award.

Cannonier faced Israel Adesanya for the UFC Middleweight Championship on July 2, 2022, at UFC 276. He lost the bout via unanimous decision.

Cannonier was scheduled to face Sean Strickland on October 15, 2022 at UFC Fight Night 212. However, the bout was scrapped after Strickland withdrew due to a finger infection. The pair was rebooked for UFC Fight Night 216 on December 17, 2022. Cannonier won the fight via split decision.

Championships and accomplishments

Mixed martial arts
Ultimate Fighting Championship
Fight of the Night (One time) 
Performance of the Night (Four times) 
Alaska Fighting Championship
AFC Heavyweight Championship (One time)

Mixed martial arts record

|Win
|align=center|16–6
|Sean Strickland
|Decision (split)
|UFC Fight Night: Cannonier vs. Strickland
| 
|align=center|5
|align=center|5:00
|Las Vegas, Nevada, United States
|
|-
|Loss
|align=center|15–6
|Israel Adesanya
|Decision (unanimous)
|UFC 276
| 
|align=center|5
|align=center|5:00
|Las Vegas, Nevada, United States
|
|-
|Win
|align=center|15–5
|Derek Brunson
|KO (elbows)
|UFC 271
|
|align=center|2
|align=center|4:29
|Houston, Texas, United States
|
|-
|Win
|align=center|14–5
|Kelvin Gastelum
|Decision (unanimous)
|UFC on ESPN: Cannonier vs. Gastelum 
|
|align=center|5
|align=center|5:00
|Las Vegas, Nevada, United States
|  
|-
|Loss
|align=center|13–5
|Robert Whittaker
|Decision (unanimous)
|UFC 254
|
|align=center|3
|align=center|5:00
|Abu Dhabi, United Arab Emirates
|
|-
|Win
|align=center|13–4
|Jack Hermansson
|TKO (punches) 
|UFC Fight Night: Hermansson vs. Cannonier 
|
|align=center|2
|align=center|0:27
|Copenhagen, Denmark
|
|- 
|Win
|align=center|12–4
|Anderson Silva
|TKO (leg kicks)
|UFC 237
|
|align=center|1
|align=center|4:47
|Rio de Janeiro, Brazil
|
|-
|Win
|align=center|11–4
|David Branch
|TKO (punches)
|UFC 230 
|
|align=center|2
|align=center|0:39
|New York City, New York, United States
|
|-
|Loss
|align=center|10–4
|Dominick Reyes
|TKO (punches)
|UFC Fight Night: Maia vs. Usman
|
|align=center|1
|align=center|2:55
|Santiago, Chile
|
|-
|Loss
|align=center|10–3
|Jan Błachowicz
|Decision (unanimous)
|UFC on Fox: Lawler vs. dos Anjos 
|
|align=center|3
|align=center|5:00
|Winnipeg, Manitoba, Canada
|
|-
|Win
|align=center|10–2
|Nick Roehrick
|TKO (elbows)
|The Ultimate Fighter: Redemption Finale
|
|align=center|3
|align=center|2:08
|Las Vegas, Nevada, United States
|
|-
|Loss
|align=center|9–2
|Glover Teixeira
|Decision (unanimous)
|UFC 208
|
|align=center|3
|align=center|5:00
|Brooklyn, New York, United States
|
|-
|Win
|align=center|9–1
|Ion Cuțelaba
|Decision (unanimous)
|The Ultimate Fighter: Tournament of Champions Finale 
|
|align=center|3
|align=center|5:00
|Las Vegas, Nevada, United States
|
|-
|Win
|style="text-align:center;"|8–1
|Cyril Asker
|KO (punches and elbows)
|UFC Fight Night: Rothwell vs. dos Santos
|
|style="text-align:center;"|1
|style="text-align:center;"|2:44
|Zagreb, Croatia
|
|-
| Loss
| align=center|7–1
| Shawn Jordan
| KO (punches)
| UFC 182
| 
| align=center|1
| align=center|2:57
| Las Vegas, Nevada, United States
| 
|-
|Win
|align=center|7–0
|Tony Lopez
|Decision (split)
|Alaska Fighting Championship 104
|
|align=center|5
|align=center|5:00
|Anchorage, Alaska, United States
|
|-
|Win
|align=center|6–0
|Jermaine Haughton
|TKO (punches)
|Alaska Fighting Championship 102
|
|align=center|1
|align=center|1:50
|Anchorage, Alaska, United States
|
|-
|Win
|align=center|5–0
|Stephen Waalkes
|Submission (rear-naked choke)
|AK Entertainment: Tuesday Night Fights
|
|align=center|2
|align=center|2:02
|Wasilla, Alaska, United States
|
|-
|Win
|align=center|4–0
|Joshua Ofiu
|TKO (punches)
|Alaska Fighting Championship 97
|
|align=center|1
|align=center|2:56
|Anchorage, Alaska, United States
|
|-
|Win
|align=center|3–0
|Matt Herringshaw
|TKO (submission to punches)
|Alaska Cage Fighting: Tribute to Veterans
|
|align=center|1
|align=center|0:29
|Fairbanks, Alaska, United States
|
|-
|Win
|align=center|2–0
|Jason Coomes
|Submission (armbar)
|Alaska Fighting Championship 85
|
|align=center|1
|align=center|0:46
|Anchorage, Alaska, United States
|
|-
|Win
|align=center|1–0
|Alton Prince
|TKO (punches)
|Midnight Sun Mayhem 1
|
|align=center|1
|align=center|N/A
|Fairbanks, Alaska, United States
|

See also
 List of current UFC fighters
 List of male mixed martial artists

References

External links
 

1984 births
Living people
African-American mixed martial artists
American male mixed martial artists
Heavyweight mixed martial artists
Light heavyweight mixed martial artists
Middleweight mixed martial artists
Mixed martial artists utilizing Brazilian jiu-jitsu
American practitioners of Brazilian jiu-jitsu
Sportspeople from Dallas
Mixed martial artists from Texas
Ultimate Fighting Championship male fighters
21st-century African-American sportspeople
20th-century African-American people